The Czech Men's Curling Championship is the national championship of men's curling in the Czech Republic. It has been held annually since 1991 and organized by the Czech Curling Association.

List of champions
Teams line-up in order: fourth, third, second, lead, alternate, coach; skips marked in bold.

References

See also
Czech Women's Curling Championship
Czech Mixed Curling Championship
Czech Mixed Doubles Curling Championship
Czech Junior Curling Championships